The Campaign Against Racial Discrimination (CARD) was a British organization, founded in 1964 and which lasted until 1967, that lobbied for race relations legislation. The group's formation was inspired by a visit by Martin Luther King Jr. to London in December 1964 on his way to Oslo to receive the Nobel Peace Prize. The Trinidadian pacifist Marion Glean, then a graduate student at the London School of Economics, arranged with Bayard Rustin for King to meet a group of Black spokespersons and activists at the Hilton Hotel, where an ad hoc committee was formed for a movement to "agitate for social justice and oppose all forms of discrimination", with CARD formally being launched at the next meeting on 10 January 1965.

CARD's founding members included Jocelyn Barrow as well as Marion Glean, politician Anthony Lester, London County Councillor David Pitt, historian C.L.R. James, Dipak Nandy and the sociologist Hamza Alavi. Lawyer Richard Small served as CARD's press officer.

References

Further reading
 Benjamin W. Heineman, Jr. The Politics of the Powerless: A Study of the Campaign Against Racial Discrimination. London: Oxford University Press, for the Institute of Race Relations, 1972.

External links
Thirty Years On - Anthony Lester
Baron Pitt of Hampstead & CARD - UK Parliament Living Heritage

Political organisations based in the United Kingdom
Race relations in the United Kingdom
Anti-racist organisations in the United Kingdom
1964 establishments in the United Kingdom
1967 disestablishments in the United Kingdom
Organizations established in 1964
Organizations disestablished in 1967